Ralph Black may refer to:

Ralph Black (soccer) (born 1963), former indoor soccer player
Ralph Niger, also known by the Anglicized name Ralph Black, English chronicler